Broekhuizen is a Dutch toponymic surname referring to any of a number of places in the Low Countries named Broekhuizen or Broekhuysen. Among variant forms are Broeckhuys, Broekhuis, and Broekhuijsen. People with this name include:

Henk Broekhuis, pseudonym of Karel van het Reve (1921–1999), Dutch writer, translator and literary historian
Joan van Broekhuizen (1649–1707), Dutch classical scholar and poet
Joe Broekhuizen (born 1991), American soccer player
Nico Broekhuysen (1876–1958), Dutch teacher, inventor of korfball
Wilfried Brookhuis (born 1961), Dutch football goalkeeper

References

Dutch-language surnames
Dutch toponymic surnames